Phosphorus sulfides comprise a family of inorganic compounds containing only phosphorus and sulfur. These compounds have the formula  with n ≤ 10. Two are of commercial significance, phosphorus pentasulfide, which is made on a kiloton scale for the production of other organosulfur compounds, and phosphorus sesquisulfide, used in the production of "strike anywhere matches".

Six of these phosphorus sulfides exist as isomers: . These isomers are distinguished by Greek letter prefixes. The prefix is based on the order of the discovery of the isomers, not their structure. All known molecular phosphorus sulfides contain a tetrahedral array of four phosphorus atoms.  is also known but is unstable above −30 °C.

Preparation
The main method for preparing these compounds is thermolysis of mixtures of phosphorus and sulfur. The product distributions can be analyzed by 31P-NMR spectroscopy. More selective syntheses entail:
desulfurization, e.g. using triphenylphosphine and, complementarily,
sulfidation using triphenylarsine sulfide.

Phosphorus sesquisulfide is prepared by treating red phosphorus with sulfur above 450 K, followed by careful recrystallization with carbon disulfide and benzene. An alternative method involves the controlled fusion of white phosphorus with sulfur in an inert, non-flammable solvent.

 can be synthesized by the reaction of stoichiometric amounts of phosphorus, sulfur, and iodine.

The respective product distribution is then analyzed by using 31P-NMR spectroscopy.

can be made by abstracting a sulfur atom from  using triphenylphosphine:

is most conveniently made by direct union of the corresponding elements, and is one of the most easily purified binary phosphorus sulfides.

can be made by two methods. Another 

is one of the most stable phosphorus sulfides. It is most easily made by heating white phosphorus with sulfur above 570 K in an evacuated tube.

See also
Diphosphorus trisulfide

References

Inorganic phosphorus compounds
Sulfides